Scott Andrew Burgess (born 12 August 1997) is an English professional footballer who plays as a central midfielder for Kidderminster Harriers on loan from  club York City. He has played in the English Football League for Bury and Port Vale.

Burgess started his career with Bury, making his first-team debut in May 2014. From there he was loaned out to non-league sides Stalybridge Celtic, Macclesfield Town, Wrexham and York City, as well as Norwegian Third Division club Bergsøy. He spent the whole of the 2017–18 season at Macclesfield and helped them to win the National League title. He joined Port Vale on a free transfer in May 2019 and stayed with the club for two-and-a-half seasons, before joining Grimsby Town in January 2022. He signed with York City in July 2022.

Career

Bury
Burgess was born in Warrington, Cheshire. He came through the youth system of Bury. Burgess played in every youth-team match in the 2013–14 season, making 28 appearances as the team reached the Lancashire Senior Cup final. He made his first-team debut in League Two on 3 May 2014 in a 0–0 draw away to Morecambe, starting the match before being replaced in the 54th minute. He turned professional at the club 12 months later.

On 10 September 2015, Burgess was loaned out for one month to Stalybridge Celtic of the National League North. However, he played only 21 minutes across three substitute appearances for Stalybridge, his final game a 1–0 win over F.C. United of Manchester at Bower Fold. He joined Norwegian Third Division club Bergsøy on 31 March 2016 on loan until July. Bury manager David Flitcroft explained that he had wanted to play Burgess himself but felt unable to due to the team's good home form and poor away form.

With the club now in League One, he broke into the Bury first-team under new head coach Chris Brass during the 2016–17 season and signed a two-year contract extension in December, just days after scoring his first goal in professional football in a 4–2 defeat at Bristol Rovers. He ended the month with his second goal to earn Bury a 1–1 draw at Bradford City, lobbing goalkeeper Colin Doyle on 39 minutes. He ended the campaign with two goals and two assists in 17 appearances, though fell out of favour under new boss Lee Clark and would not feature at all in his next two seasons at Gigg Lane.

Burgess joined National League club Macclesfield Town on 4 July 2017 on loan for the 2017–18 season. He made 22 starts and 11 substitute appearances as Macclesfield were promoted to League Two as 2017–18 National League champions. He scored one goal for Macclesfield, a volley against Stourbridge in the FA Cup, which won him the club's goal of the month award for October. Speaking on his time at Moss Rose, Burgess said that "It's a tough league and it's a physical league, I'm learning each day in training and I keep learning more with each game I play and adapting to how team's play, so this loan spell has been good for me."

Burgess joined National League club Wrexham on 22 August 2018 on a three-month loan. He returned to Bury on 22 November after making only two appearances for Sam Ricketts's Wrexham due to the form of other players. He joined National League North club York City on 24 January 2019 on loan until the end of the 2018–19 season. Assistant manager Micky Cummins revealed that manager Steve Watson had previously tried to sign him whilst at Gateshead. Often used as an attacking central midfielder in a 4–3–3 formation, he played 16 matches for York and scored one goal, a long-range volley against Kidderminster Harriers that was named York's goal of the season. He was offered a permanent contract by the club at the end of the season.

Port Vale
Burgess signed for League Two club Port Vale, who were managed by former Macclesfield manager John Askey, on 24 May 2019 on a one-year contract. Speaking in September, Askey said that he would "possibly" look to get Burgess out on loan to a National League side as the midfielder had failed to make a first-team appearance for Vale. He finally made his first-team debut on 24 September, and marked it with a goal in a 3–2 victory at former club Macclesfield Town in the EFL Trophy. After the game he said that "I have had to be patient with the team doing well in the league, but the gaffer spoke to me and just encouraged me in training to keep working hard. I am glad to get my chance and hopefully I have repaid him with a good performance". Despite also scoring in his league debut four days later, he had to wait until the end of October before managing to firmly secure a place in the starting eleven in a high-energy pressing midfield three with Jake Taylor and Luke Joyce. He signed a two-year contract extension in February 2020. He scored four goals in 29 appearances throughout the 2019–20 season and won the club's Young Player of the Year award.

The 2020–21 season was a poor one for Burgess as lots of competition for places in central midfield meant that he made only two starts after Darrell Clarke was appointed manager in February. Clarke placed Burgess on the transfer-list in May 2021. He was not given a squad number for the 2021–22 season and Clarke said that he would try and arrange a loan move into the National League. However no move materialized and in November Clarke confirmed that Burgess would be reintegrated into the squad and become available for selection for first-team games, though said that Ben Garrity, Tom Pett, Tom Conlon, Jake Taylor and Brad Walker "are probably ahead of him in the pecking order as things stand". On 14 January 2022, Burgess had his contract with Port Vale terminated by mutual consent.

Grimsby Town
On the same day as his departure from Port Vale was confirmed, Burgess signed for National League club Grimsby Town on a deal to run until the end of the 2021–22 season. Grimsby manager Paul Hurst said that he would offer creativity to the midfield that had been lacking in the absence of John McAtee. Having appeared three times as a substitute in order to help build his fitness, Burgess made his full debut on 12 February in a 3–1 win over Aldershot Town at Blundell Park. Grimsby secured promotion with a 2–1 victory over Solihull Moors in the play-off final at the London Stadium, although Burgess was not in the matchday squad. On 11 June, the club announced their retained list and confirmed that Burgess would be released upon the expiry of his contract at the end of the month.

York City
On 30 June 2022, Burgess joined newly-promoted National League club York City, alongside Grimsby teammate Adam Crookes, both of whom had played under York City manager John Askey at Port Vale.

Kidderminster Harriers (loan)
On 30 September 2022, Burgess joined National League North club Kidderminster Harriers on loan until January 2023.

Style of play
Burgess can play in the centre or right-side of midfield and is known as a creative attacking player, though lacking physical presence. Speaking in May 2019, York City assistant manager Micky Cummins described him as brave and comfortable on the ball, with good technical and dead ball skills.

Career statistics

Honours
Macclesfield Town
National League: 2017–18

References

External links
Profile at the Grimsby Town F.C. website

1996 births
Living people
Footballers from Warrington
English footballers
Association football midfielders
Bury F.C. players
Stalybridge Celtic F.C. players
Macclesfield Town F.C. players
Wrexham A.F.C. players
York City F.C. players
Port Vale F.C. players
Grimsby Town F.C. players
Kidderminster Harriers F.C. players
English Football League players
National League (English football) players
Norwegian Third Division players
English expatriate footballers
Expatriate footballers in Norway
English expatriate sportspeople in Norway